Everybody Knows is the debut album by English dance-pop singer Sonia, released in April 1990. The album was predominantly written and produced by Stock Aitken Waterman and includes the UK and Irish number one single "You'll Never Stop Me Loving You" and the UK top 20 hits "Can't Forget You", "Listen to Your Heart", "Counting Every Minute", and "End of the World".  At the time of release, Sonia became the first female UK artist to achieve five top 20 hit singles from one album. Everybody Knows was re-issued by Cherry Red Records in September 2010 in remastered and expanded form.

Critical reception
A review in Pan-European magazine Music & Media noted that as a Stock, Aitken & Waterman production, the album "style will come
as no surprise - persistent, bubbling dance grooves topped off by the ultimate girl-next-door voice", and added that "every track is a potential single".

Chart performance
Everybody Knows reached number seven on the UK Albums Chart, and was certified gold by the British Phonographic Industry for sales exceeding 100,000 copies. The album peaked at No. 144 on the Australian ARIA albums chart. Sonia had a further UK top 20 single in 1990, with "You've Got a Friend", recorded with Big Fun, in aid of ChildLine.  Despite her chart success, the record company Chrysalis ended their recording contract with Sonia following the album.

Track listing
All tracks written by Stock, Aitken and Waterman, except where noted.

 "You'll Never Stop Me Loving You" – 3:22
 "Everybody Knows" – 3:27
 "Listen to Your Heart" – 3:25
 "Someone Like You" – 3:52 (Ian Curnow, Phil Harding, Bill Clift)
 "Counting Every Minute" – 3:33
 "Can't Forget You" – 3:25
 "Now I'm Without You" – 3:29 (Ian Curnow, Phil Harding, Bill Clift)
 "Can't Help the Way That I Feel" – 3:30
 "Climb to the Top of a Mountain" – 3:37 (Ian Curnow, Phil Harding, Bill Clift)
 "End of the World" – 3:36 (Arthur Kent, Sylvia Dee)

CD version of the album also included "You'll Never Stop Me Loving You" (Sonia's Kiss Mix).

2010 re-issue
Bonus tracks
"Better Than Ever"
 "You'll Never Stop Me Loving You" (Extended Version)
 "Can't Forget You" (Extended Version)
 "Listen to Your Heart" (Extended Version)
 "Counting Every Minute" (The King's Counting House Mix)
 "You'll Never Stop Me Loving You" (XXX Kiss Mix)
 "Let's Have a Party"
 "You'll Never Stop Me Loving You" (Demo Version)

References

1990 debut albums
Albums produced by Stock Aitken Waterman
Chrysalis Records albums
Sonia (singer) albums